Girl Arranging Her Hair is an 1886 painting by American artist Mary Cassatt. The painting is in the collection of the National Gallery of Art, in Washington, D.C. Edgar Degas and Cassatt had a complicated relationship; Degas acquired the painting after it was exhibited at the 1886 eighth Impressionist exhibition, and after his death, it was mistakenly identified as his own work.

References

1886 paintings
Paintings by Mary Cassatt
Collections of the National Gallery of Art
Paintings of children